Scilla bithynica, the Turkish squill, is a species of flowering plant in the genus Scilla, native to Bulgaria and Turkey. It has gained the Royal Horticultural Society's Award of Garden Merit.

References

bithynica
Flora of Bulgaria
Flora of Turkey
Plants described in 1846